The Richest Man in Town is a 1941 comedy film directed by Charles Barton, which stars Frank Craven, Edgar Buchanan, and Eileen O'Hearn.

Cast list
 Frank Craven as Abb Crothers
 Edgar Buchanan as Pete Martin
 Eileen O'Hearn as Mary Martin
Roger Pryor as Tom Manning
 Tom Dugan as Jack Leslie
 George McKay as Jerry Ross
 Jimmy Dodd as Bill
 Jan Duggan as Penelope Kidwell
 John Tyrrell as Ozzie Williams
 Harry Tyler as Cliff Smithers
 Will Wright as Frederick Johnson
 Joel Friedkin as Ed Gunther
 Erville Alderson as Jenkins
 Thomas Ross as Dr. Dickenson
 Eddie Earle as Berton
 Ferris Taylor as Perkins
 George Guhl as Sheriff
 Netta Packer as Miss Andrews
 William Gould as Thorpe
 Kathryn Sheldon as Martha

References

External links
 
 
 

1941 films
1940s English-language films
Columbia Pictures films
Films directed by Charles Barton
1941 comedy films
American comedy films
American black-and-white films
1941 drama films
1940s American films